David Taylor Chastain (born August 31, 1953) is an American heavy metal guitarist and the owner of Leviathan Records and Diginet Music.

Chastain emerged in the mid-1980s along with a wave of other neo-classical guitarists. He has released about 50 recordings under multiple names, including David T. Chastain, CJSS, Georgia Blues Dawgs, The Cincinnati Improvisational Group, SPIKE, Zanister, Ruud Cooty and Southern Gentlemen (blues-rock); as well as a number of heavy metal releases under the band name Chastain, accompanied by female vocalist Leather Leone.

In more recent years, Chastain has worked as a record producer at his own company, Leviathan Records. His label specializes in discovering and promoting new talents, specializing in guitarists and bands.  He also runs Diginet Music, a company specializing in rare, unreleased or out-of-print music.

Discography

Solo albums 
Instrumental Variations – 1987 Leviathan Records
Within the Heat – 1989 Leviathan Records
Elegant Seduction – 1991 Leviathan Records
Movements Thru Time – 1992 Leviathan Records, Compilation album
Next Planet Please – 1994 Leviathan Records
Acoustic Visions – 1998 Leviathan Records
Rock Solid Guitar – 2001 Leviathan Records
Prisoner of Time – 2005 Diginet Music
Countdown to Infinity – 2007 Leviathan Records
Heavy Excursions – 2009 Leviathan Records, Compilation album
Civilized Warfare – 2011 Leviathan Records

With Spike 
The Price of Pleasure – 1983 Starbound Records

With CJSS 
World Gone Mad- 1985 Leviathan Records
Praise the Loud – 1986 Leviathan Records
Kings of the World – 2000 Pavement Music

With Chastain 
Mystery of Illusion – 1985 Shrapnel Records
Ruler of the Wasteland – 1986 Shrapnel Records
The 7th of Never – 1987 Leviathan Records
The Voice of the Cult – 1988 Leviathan Records
For Those Who Dare – 1990 Leviathan Records
Sick Society – 1995 Leviathan Records
In Dementia – 1997 Leviathan Records
In an Outrage – 2004 Leviathan Records
The Reign of Leather – 2010 Leviathan Records
Surrender To No One – 2013 Leviathan Records
We Bleed Metal – 2015 Leviathan Records
We Bleed Metal 17 – 2017 Leviathan Records

With Zanister 
Symphonica Millennia – 1999 Shark Records (David T. Chastain – Guitars, Keyboards, Production)
Fear No Man – 2001 Leviathan Records (David T. Chastain – Guitars, Production)

With Southern Gentlemen 
Exotic Dancer Blues – 2000 Leviathan Records (David T. Chastain – Guitars, Vocals, Production)
Double Your Pleasure – 2003 Leviathan Records (David T. Chastain – Guitar, Vocals, Production)
Third Time Is the Charm – 2006 Leviathan Records (David T. Chastain – Guitar, Production)
Valley of Fire – 2008 Leviathan Records (David T. Chastain – Guitar, Production)
Instrumentalized – 2009 Leviathan Records (David T. Chastain – Guitar, Production)

Other appearances 
Shockwaves – Leather – 1990 Roadrunner Records (Music, Lyrics, Production)
Live! Wild and Truly Diminished!! – 1992 Leviathan Records (David Chastain and Michael Harris)
Masahiro Chono 21st Century Prelude – 1995 Teichiku Records ("Victory March ~ Shogeki ~," "After The Battle ~ Chikai Chi ~," "Victory March (Full Power Version) ~ Shogeki II ~")
Aftermath – Ruud Cooty – 2002 Lucretia Records (David T. Chastain – Guitars, Arrangements, Production, Mixing)
Burning Earth – Firewind – 2003 Leviathan Records (David T. Chastain – Production, Vocal Engineering, Additional Background Vocals)
Hurricane X – Michael Harris – 2003 Leviathan Records (David T. Chastain – Bass, Executive Production)
Armed and Ready – Joe Stump – 2003 Leviathan Records (David T. Chastain – Bass, Executive Production)
Destination – Corbin King – 2004 Leviathan Records (David T. Chastain – Bass, Executive Production)
Shredology/Midwest Shredfest – Joe Stump – 2005 Leviathan Records (David T. Chastain – Arrangements, Bass)

Music videos 
"For Those Who Dare" – Chastain – 1990
"Bullet From A Gun" – Chastain – 2004
"Rise Up" – Chastain – 2013
"Evil Awaits Us" – Chastain – 2014
"I Am Sin" – Chastain – 2014
"All Hail The King" – 2015
"I live for today" – 2017

References

External links 
David T. Chastain | AllMusic
Leviathan Records
Diginet Music

1953 births
Living people
American heavy metal guitarists
Musicians from Atlanta
Guitarists from Georgia (U.S. state)
Record producers from Georgia (U.S. state)
American male guitarists
Chastain (band) members
20th-century American guitarists
20th-century American male musicians